Clarete may refer to:

Julia Clarete (born 1979), a Filipina entertainer
, a Spanish wine similar to rosé